The Pagan reed warbler (Acrocephalus yamashinae)  was sometimes considered a subspecies of the nightingale reed warbler. It originally occurred on Pagan Island and "was extinct by the late 1970s". More precisely, in the 1970s, the 1980s, in 2000 and in 2010, the bird could not be found and is therefore presumed to be extinct.

References

Pagan reed warbler
Birds of the Northern Mariana Islands
Extinct birds of Oceania
Bird extinctions since 1500
Pagan reed warbler